In mathematics, the equilateral dimension of a metric space is the maximum size of any subset of the space whose points are all at equal distances to each other. Equilateral dimension has also been called "metric dimension", but the term "metric dimension" also has many other inequivalent usages. However, the equilateral dimension of a space with the Manhattan distance ( norm) is not known; Kusner's conjecture, named after Robert B. Kusner, states that it is exactly , achieved by a cross polytope.

Lebesgue spaces
The equilateral dimension has been particularly studied for Lebesgue spaces, finite-dimensional normed vector spaces with the  norm

The equilateral dimension of  spaces of dimension  behaves differently depending on the value of :

For , the  norm gives rise to Manhattan distance. In this case, it is possible to find  equidistant points, the vertices of an axis-aligned cross polytope. Robert B. Kusner suggested in 1983 that the equilateral dimension for this case should be exactly ; this suggestion (together with a related suggestion for the equilateral dimension when ) has come to be known as Kusner's conjecture.
For , the  norm is the familiar Euclidean distance. The equilateral dimension of -dimensional Euclidean space is : the  vertices of an equilateral triangle, regular tetrahedron, or higher-dimensional regular simplex form an equilateral set, and every equilateral set must have this form.
For , the equilateral dimension is at least : for instance the  basis vectors of the vector space together with another vector of the form  for a suitable choice of  form an equilateral set. Kusner's conjecture states that in these cases the equilateral dimension is exactly . Kusner's conjecture has been proven for the special case that .
For a -dimensional vector space with the Chebyshev distance, the equilateral dimension is : the  vertices of an axis-aligned hypercube are at equal distances from each other, and no larger equilateral set is possible.

Normed vector spaces
Equilateral dimension has also been considered for normed vector spaces with norms other than the  norms. The problem of determining the equilateral dimension for a given norm is closely related to the kissing number problem: the kissing number in a normed space is the maximum number of disjoint translates of a unit ball that can all touch a single central ball, whereas the equilateral dimension is the maximum number of disjoint translates that can all touch each other.

For a normed vector space of dimension , the equilateral dimension is at most ; that is, the  norm has the highest equilateral dimension among all normed spaces.  asked whether every normed vector space of dimension  has equilateral dimension at least , but this remains unknown. There exist normed spaces in any dimension for which certain sets of four equilateral points cannot be extended to any larger equilateral set but these spaces may have larger equilateral sets that do not include these four points. For norms that are sufficiently close in Banach–Mazur distance to an  norm, Petty's question has a positive answer: the equilateral dimension is at least .

for some constant . Because it is close to a Lebesgue space, this subspace and therefore also the whole space contains an equilateral set of at least  points. Therefore, the same superlogarithmic dependence on  holds for the lower bound on the equilateral dimension of -dimensional space.

Riemannian manifolds
For any -dimensional Riemannian manifold the equilateral dimension is at least . At the same time as he posed Kusner's conjecture, Kusner asked whether there exist Riemannian metrics with bounded dimension as a manifold but arbitrarily high equilateral dimension.

Notes

References

.
.
.
.
.
.
.
.
.
.

Metric geometry
Dimension theory